Aoraia flavida is a species of moth from the family Hepialidae. It is endemic to New Zealand. This species was described by John S. Dugdale in 1994 from specimens obtained near Gem Lake in the Umbrella Mountains in Southland and collected by B. H. Patrick.

Physical description
The wingspan is 47–50 mm for males. Females are brachypterous. The forewing pattern in males is ash-white or creamy white on chocolate brown. The hindwings are smoky brown. In females, the forewings are patterned in broad, irregular fields of dark brown and brownish fawn. Adults can be found from March to April.

References

External links

Moths described in 1994
Hepialidae
Moths of New Zealand
Endemic fauna of New Zealand
Endemic moths of New Zealand